"Push Eject" is a maxi single by the Japanese electronica/rock duo Boom Boom Satellites, combining the title track taken of their first Out Loud album with tracks and remixes previously available on their 7 Ignitions EP in the West.

The song is on OST for the game Gran Turismo 2.

Versions
Numerous releases of the song exist, published variously by Sony Japan, R&S and Epic, including a number of promos. The fullest version is the standard Sony release, whose track listing is noted below. Other versions include, variously, a radio edit, a remix by Howie B, "Limbo" (another track from their Out Loud album) and the standard version of "4 A Moment of Silence" in place of some or all of the tracks listed below. Despite the extended track list of the standard version, it is still classed as a maxi single by retailers although a discography page on the band's official site refers to it as an "album".

In the early 2000s, a version recorded from radio was available on many MP3 file sharing systems such as Napster. The song was mistakenly identified as a track called "Digital" by the American industrial rock band Nine Inch Nails from their album The Fragile.

Track listing

Personnel
Credits adapted from liner notes.
 Art Direction, Design, Photography By [Live Photos] – Shinichiro Hirata
 Additional drums and programming - Naoki Hirai 
 Guitar, Vocals – Michiyuki Kawashima
 Photography By – Shouji Uchida*
 Programmed By, Bass – Masayuki Nakano
 Written-By, Arranged By, Producer – Boom Boom Satellites

References

External links
 Boom Boom Satellites official website

Boom Boom Satellites songs
1998 singles
1998 songs